McChord Field Historic District is a historic district located within the McChord Air Force Base in Pierce County, Washington.  The base is located at the base of Puget Sound.  The 31 contributing buildings and 3 contributing structures included in the district all date to the establishment of McChord Field and its role in World War II.  Additionally, the district is significant for its architecture representative of the period from 1938 through 1952.  It was listed on the National Register of Historic Places on December 12, 2008.

It is the 24th property listed as a featured property of the week in a program of the National Park Service that began in July, 2008.

See also
 National Register of Historic Places listings in Washington

References

Military facilities on the National Register of Historic Places in Washington (state)
Geography of Pierce County, Washington
Airports on the National Register of Historic Places
World War II on the National Register of Historic Places
Historic districts on the National Register of Historic Places in Washington (state)
National Register of Historic Places in Tacoma, Washington
Transportation buildings and structures on the National Register of Historic Places in Washington (state)
Joint Base Lewis–McChord